The Ferrari 599 GTB Fiorano (internal code F141) is a grand tourer produced by Italian automobile manufacturer Ferrari. It was the brand's front engined, two-seat model that replaced the 575M Maranello in 2006 as a 2007 model, and was replaced for the 2013 model year by the F12berlinetta.

Styled by Pininfarina under the direction of Jason Castriota, the 599 GTB debuted at the Geneva Motor Show in February 2006. The bodywork features optimized aerodynamics with distinct sail panels flanking the rear window, directing and maximizing air flow to a linear rear nolder.

The 599 is named for its total engine displacement , Gran Turismo Berlinetta nature, and the Fiorano Circuit test track used by Ferrari.

Specifications

Drivetrain

Its  of torque produced at 5,600 rpm was also a record for Ferrari's GT cars at the time. Most of the modifications to the engine were done to allow it to fit in the 599's engine bay (the original version used in the Ferrari Enzo would be taller and would block forward vision due to its mid-mounted position construction).

A traditional 6-speed manual transmission was offered, as well as Ferrari's 6-speed automated manual paddle-shift transmission called "F1 SuperFast" which had a shift time of 100 milliseconds in the standard 599 or 85 milliseconds if equipped with the HGTE package. The 599 also saw the debut of Ferrari's new traction control system, F1-Trac. The vast majority of the 599 GTB's were equipped with the automated manual gearbox as opposed to the 6-speed manual gearbox. Only 30 examples were produced with a manual gearbox of which 20 were destined to the United States and 10 remained in Europe leading Ferrari to abandon the use of the manual transmission in its future GT cars. 599 GTB Fiorano was the last V12-engined Ferrari to be equipped with manual transmission.

Chassis
The 599 saw the use of an aluminium chassis for the first time in a Ferrari GT car, as opposed to the tubular steel chassis used in its predecessors. The 599 boasts a longer wheelbase than its predecessor and the fuel tank is positioned at the rear in a mid mounted position for better weight distribution. Due to such measures, the 599 has a claimed power to weight ratio of 367 PS per tonne.

Aerodynamics

The 599 utilises an underbody spoiler and venturi tunnels that contribute to downforce. The arched C-pillars in a 'flying buttress' style also aid further in downforce by channeling the air around the rear section thus eliminating the need of a rear wing. The buttresses were initially a styling exercise by exterior designer Jason Castriota. Their aerodynamic effect was proven by Ferrari aerodynamicist Luca Caldirola with the wind tunnel testing. The car also has functional brake cooling ducts on the front and rear body panels for improved brake cooling.

Suspension and brakes

The 599 utilises magnetorheological semi-active dampers along with its suspension coils. The dampers function by a liquid within the damper reservoir which when subject to magnetic field within the liquid chamber, changes its viscosity. The function of the liquid along with the reaction and stability control are controlled through a knob on the steering wheel. The 599 came with cast iron brakes as standard while the carbon-ceramic brakes (a technology that was scarcely utilised in road cars at the time) were available as an option.

Interior
The 599 came with a luxurious leather trimmed interior. The driver's seat was positioned slightly towards the centre in order to provide a better driving position. The instrument cluster was a combination of analogue gauges and screens. The shift paddles could either be optioned in aluminium or in carbon fibre and were affixed to the steering column. The three spoke steering wheel housed controls for the car's electronic systems as well as a starter button. The interior has a glove box, storage space in the door panels and combination of simple dials and buttons for operating the stereo, climate control and air conditioning. The car has a rear shelf and a boot-lid providing adequate boot space.

Performance
Performance claimed by Ferrari.
 0- in 3.7 seconds
 0- in 11.1 seconds
 Top speed: over

Variants

599 HGTE 

The Ferrari 599 GTB Fiorano HGTE (HGTE being an abbreviation of Handling Gran Turismo Evoluzione) is an upgrade package for the 599 designed to improve the car's handling. It includes a modified set-up with stiffer springs and rear anti-roll bar as well as new calibration settings for the Delphi MagneRide magneto-rheological shock absorbers when the manettino is at its sportier settings. The ride height has also been lowered, resulting in a low centre of gravity. The package also includes optimised tyres featuring a compound that offers improved grip. The car's electronic systems were also changed. The gearbox's shift times were faster in high-performance settings, while new engine software provided improved response. The exhaust was modified to produce a more marked and thrilling sound under hard usage while still delivering the right comfort levels at cruising speed. The exterior and interior were upgraded with more carbon fibre components and the car also included new 20-inch wheels.

599 GTO 

On 8 April 2010, Ferrari announced official details of the 599 GTO (for Gran Turismo Omologato). The car was a road-legal version of the 599XX track day car and at the time Ferrari claimed that the 599 GTO was their fastest ever road car, able to lap the Fiorano test circuit in 1 minute 24 seconds, one second faster than the Ferrari Enzo Ferrari. The car has the multiple shift program for the gearbox from the 599XX along with the exhaust system. At , the 599 GTO weighs almost  less than the standard GTB. Production was limited to 599 cars. Of these, approximately 125 were produced for the United States market.
Ferrari has produced only two other models that used the GTO designation: the 1962 250 GTO and the 1984 288 GTO with the third being the 599 GTO. Unlike the previous GTOs however, the 599 GTO was not designed for homologation in any racing series.

Special variants

SA Aperta

The roadster variant of the 599, the SA Aperta, was introduced at the 2010 Paris Motor Show as a limited edition in honour of designers Sergio Pininfarina and Andrea Pininfarina, with the "SA" designation standing for both their names. The SA Aperta utilised the higher performance engine and gearbox from the 599 GTO and has a  lower ride height, thicker rear anti roll bar and recalibrated magnetic dampers. The SA Aperta also has a slightly raked windscreen as compared to the 599 GTB along with larger cooling ducts in the new front bumper and a rear bumper in body colour. The car has a removable soft top that was only intended for use in city driving and to protect the interior from rain. The boot-lid was made of aluminium while the C-pillars were made of carbon fibre and have a silver finish along with the windshield frame. The exhaust system was a modified version of the one used in the 599XX and the car has special 5-spoke wheels unique to the variant with a chromed finish along with a triple layer body paint. The interior was also redesigned and has a two-tone colour scheme and the car has sports seats as standard equipment. Only 80 examples were produced, honoring the 80th anniversary of Pininfarina and all were sold before the car was unveiled to the public.

599 GTB 60F1

In December 2011, Ferrari announced a special edition of the 599 GTB to celebrate 60 years of their wins in F1. From Froilán González's win at Silverstone in 1951 with the 375 F1, to Fernando Alonso's win at Silverstone in 2011 in the 150° Italia, Ferrari have been winning hundreds of F1 races. The car was based on the 599 HGTE chassis, that utilised stiff suspension, shorter springs and stiffer anti-roll bars. The new 20" diamond-finished forged alloy wheels and Scuderia Ferrari shields came on the body as standard. There were three choices of paint finishes to choose from: 
 The colours of the 375 F1 – darker and standing out more than Ferrari Rosso
 The colours of the 150° Italia, with the Italian tricolore styled mini spoiler at the back and the white parts of the front spoiler on the body
 Another version of the 150° Italia but without the white a-pillars.

The interior in the European version of the car has Sabelt bucket seats whereas the US version featured Recaro bucket seats, both being made from Alcantara.

One-off models

P540 Superfast Aperta

The Ferrari P540 Superfast Aperta is a one-off convertible sports car based on the Ferrari 599 GTB Fiorano. This car represents the second car in Ferrari's Special Project program.

Edward Walson commissioned the car in 2008, asking Ferrari to build a modern interpretation of the gold covered Carrozzeria Fantuzzi-bodied Ferrari 330 LMB built for the 1968 film Spirits of the Dead. The P540 was revealed to the public on December 11, 2009, but had been spotted in spy shots several months previous to this.

Designed by Pininfarina and built in Maranello, this car was designed to comply with international safety and homologation requirements. Using finite element analysis and carbon fibre, the car's chassis was stiffened for the conversion to a convertible body style. As it is based on the 599 GTB F1, many of the specifications of the P540 are similar to its donor car. Total time of development was 14 months.

Superamerica 45
The Ferrari Superamerica 45 is a one-off with a rotating targa hardtop based on the 599 GTB, that was commissioned to Ferrari by longtime Ferrari enthusiast and collector Peter Kalikow to commemorate his 45 years as a Ferrari client. Part of Ferrari's Special Project programme, it was designed at Centro Stile Ferrari and engineered in-house by Ferrari.
The car made its public debut at Concorso d'Eleganza Villa d'Este on 20 May 2011.

The carbon fibre hardtop roof incorporates a rear screen and rotates around a horizontal axis behind the cabin, a mechanism similar to that of the 2005 Ferrari Superamerica. The boot, also made from carbon fibre, has been redesigned to house the roof when open and to increase downforce at the rear of the car. As well as being finished in Blu Antille, other key visual features include a chromed front grille, body coloured wheels, carbon fibre panels and special burnished aluminum A-pillars, wing mirrors and door handles.
The interior features a combination of Cuoio leather trim and Blu Scuro carbon fibre as well as a latest-generation touch-screen infotainment system.

599 GTZ Nibbio Zagato 
The Zagato 599 GTZ Nibbio was introduced in 2007 by Zagato and was based on the Ferrari 599 GTB. It was limited to only nine units worldwide, seven of which were built with the F1 automated manual transmission and two with the 6-speed manual. Two of the ones with the F1 automated manual transmission are spyder. The manual coupe car, painted dark blue with a white top half, was listed for sale in December 2018 for US$1.495 million at Tomini Classics in Dubai.

SP30

The Ferrari SP30 is a one-off based on the 599 GTO and completed in 2013. It is the fifth project completed by Ferrari's special projects division and it includes elements from the 599XX and the F12 which was released a few months earlier. It was commissioned by Cheerag Arya, the owner of a petrochemical company. The car's VIN is ZFF70RDT7B0188026. The cas was then seized by the gouvernment of Abu Dhabi and was exported to the USA where it still resides today.

Prototype

Motor Authority reported that Ferrari president Luca Cordero di Montezemolo was working on the development of a Ferrari model that would use alternative energy sources and which would be based on what Ferrari is doing in Formula 1, which uses Kinetic Energy Recovery System. The KERS was tested using a 599 as a test mule. The model was later revealed to be the LaFerrari.

Awards
Evo magazine named the 599 GTB as the Car of the Year for 2006.
Top Gear Magazine also named the 599 GTB as the Supercar of the Year 2006.

Successor

The successor to the 599 was announced on 29 February 2012, a few days prior to the Geneva Motor Show. Ferrari released a video featuring Fernando Alonso and Felipe Massa driving the car at Ferrari's own test track, the Pista di Fiorano. The car, named the F12berlinetta, was officially unveiled at the Geneva Motor Show on March 6, 2012.

References

Sources

External links

 

599 GTB
2010s cars
Front mid-engine, rear-wheel-drive vehicles
Rear-wheel-drive vehicles
Cars introduced in 2006
Flagship vehicles